The Bowling at the 1983 Southeast Asian Games result. This event was held between 29 May to 4 June at Jackie's Bowl Centre.

Medal summary

Men's

Women

Medal table

References
 https://eresources.nlb.gov.sg/newspapers/Digitised/Article/straitstimes19830531-1.2.123
 https://eresources.nlb.gov.sg/newspapers/Digitised/Article/straitstimes19830601-1.2.137
 https://eresources.nlb.gov.sg/newspapers/Digitised/Article/straitstimes19830602-1.2.102
 https://eresources.nlb.gov.sg/newspapers/Digitised/Article/straitstimes19830603-1.2.129
 https://eresources.nlb.gov.sg/newspapers/Digitised/Article/straitstimes19830605-1.2.78.27

1983 Southeast Asian Games events